Oldřich Rott (born 26 May 1951) is a former football midfielder from Czechoslovakia. He was a member of the national team that won the gold medal at the 1980 Summer Olympics in Moscow. Rott obtained a total number of three caps for his native country, between 1978-05-17 and 1979-03-14.

Rott played mostly for Dukla Prague and won three times the Czechoslovak First League with them, in 1977, 1979 and 1982.

References

External links

1951 births
Living people
People from Třebechovice pod Orebem
Association football defenders
Czech footballers
Czechoslovak footballers
Footballers at the 1980 Summer Olympics
Olympic gold medalists for Czechoslovakia
Olympic footballers of Czechoslovakia
Czechoslovakia international footballers
UEFA Euro 1980 players
Expatriate footballers in Cyprus
FC Hradec Králové players
Dukla Prague footballers
SK Slavia Prague players
Olympic medalists in football
Czechoslovak expatriate footballers
Czechoslovak expatriate sportspeople in Cyprus
Cypriot First Division players
Medalists at the 1980 Summer Olympics
Sportspeople from the Hradec Králové Region